Cleeve Hill is a 15.1 hectare (37.4 acre) biological Site of Special Scientific Interest between Old Cleeve and Watchet in Somerset, notified in 1989.

The site covers a moderate to steeply sloping south face of the Washford River Valley. It supports a rich and diverse calcareous grassland community with associated mixed woodland and scrub. The site contains two species of plant which are nationally rare in Great Britain, Nit-grass (Gastridium ventricosum) and Rough Marsh-mallow (Althaea hirsuta).

References 

Sites of Special Scientific Interest in Somerset
Sites of Special Scientific Interest notified in 1989